The France national football B team is a national football team representing France that plays matches at a lower level than the France national football team. In France, the team is usually called "France A–". They commonly played matches against 'B' teams from other football associations, from 1922 to 2001.

The team runs occasionally as a feeder team for France national football team, to give a chance to under-21 or less experienced players to play for the national team without being awarded a full cap. The team may play matches held before World Cups or other tournaments to give second-choice players, injured players or possible choices an opportunity to play a full game to either keep their fitness levels up or to earn their way into the first team.

History

Pre-history

The France B team was officially created in 1922, however, at the 1908 Summer Olympics, two teams from France participated in the tournament, the main team and a "B" side, but the matches that this team played in London are not recognized by French Football Federation (FFF) as official B team games. France B was eliminated in the first round by Denmark with a score of 9–0, but the main team did no better as Denmark then defeated France A in the semi-finals by a score of 17–1, conceding 10 goals from one player alone, which was a world record at the time. Remarkably, both French teams conceded pokers from Vilhelm Wolfhagen.

Early history
France B was officially created in 1922 and the team made its debut on 15 January 1922 at the ground of SC Luxembourg in Luxembourg City, where they lost to the Luxembourg A team 3–2, courtesy of a hat-trick from Robert Elter, but France B fought back and achieved some vengeance in their next game when they faced the Luxembourg A team again on 25 February 1923 at Stade Bergeyre in Paris, this time being them the ones to win 3–2.

Mediterranean Cup
Until 1968 (sept for war years), the French B side played at least one match per year, with their most-scheduled year being in 1952 with eight matches against foreign nations A or B, of which France lost only once, a 3–1 defeat at the hands of Saarland. In the following year, France B participated in the 1953–58 Mediterranean Cup, where they faced the A teams of Turkey, Egypt and Greece home and away, as well as the B teams of Italy and Spain, and France started the tournament with three consecutive 0–0 draws before losing 0–2 to Spain B, and their inability to score goals stayed on as they then beat Greece 1–0 only thanks to an own goal, but despite their failure to score a single goal in 5 games, France regained his feet and still managed to finish the tournament in second-place with 12 points, finishing with 4 wins, 4 draws and 2 defeats, with their best victory coming against Egypt (7-1) in Nice on 15 April 1955.

Decline
After 1968, the use by French coaches of this selection became rarer: between 1971 and 1982, only eight matches took place and then the B side became inactive. It was Michel Platini, the then French coach, who revived this team under the name of France A– on 16 November 1988, which remained unchanged (sept for between 1990 and 1992, when the team was again called the "France B team") until 2001.

Recent history
The most recent match of France B was on 5 February 2008 against Congo DR in Marbella, the day before the regular A-team friendly in Málaga. The team line-up was Steve Mandanda (Hugo Lloris 46'); Gaël Clichy, Jean-Alain Boumsong, Philippe Mexès, Bacary Sagna; Jérôme Rothen, Alou Diarra, Samir Nasri (Gaël Givet 76'), Mathieu Flamini (Jérémy Menez 17'),  Jimmy Briand; Djibril Cissé; team members Sébastien Squillaci and Abou Diaby were not used.

Results

References

External links
RSSSF

France national football team
European national B association football teams